In Mormonism, the endowment is a two-part ordinance (ceremony) designed for participants to become kings, queens, priests, and priestesses in the afterlife. As part of the first ceremony, participants take part in a scripted reenactment of the Biblical creation and fall of Adam and Eve. The ceremony includes a symbolic washing and anointing, and receipt of a "new name" which they are not to reveal to others except at a certain part in the ceremony, and the receipt of the temple garment, which Mormons then are expected to wear under their clothing day and night throughout their life. Participants are taught symbolic gestures and passwords considered necessary to pass by angels guarding the way to heaven, and are instructed not to reveal them to others. As practiced today in the Church of Jesus Christ of Latter-day Saints (LDS Church), the endowment also consists of a series of covenants (promises to God) that participants make, such as a covenant of consecration to the LDS Church. All LDS Church members who choose to serve as missionaries or participate in a celestial marriage in a temple must first complete the first endowment ceremony.

The second part, or second anointing is the pinnacle ordinance of the temple, jointly given to a husband and wife couple, where their exaltation is guaranteed. Participants are anointed kings, queens, priests, and priestesses, whereas they are only anointed to become such in the first part. The second part of the endowment is given to a select group, and its existence is not widely known among the general membership.

The endowment as practiced today was instituted by founder Joseph Smith in the 1840s with further contributions by Brigham Young and his successors. The ceremony is performed in Latter Day Saint temples, which are dedicated specifically for the endowment and certain other ordinances sacred to Mormons, and are open only to Mormons who meet certain requirements. There was a brief period during the construction of the Salt Lake Temple where a small building referred to as the Endowment House was used to administer the endowment ordinance. The endowment is currently practiced by the LDS Church, several denominations of Mormon fundamentalism, and a few other Mormon denominations. The LDS Church has simplified its ceremony from its 19th century form.

A distinct endowment ceremony was also performed in the 1830s in the Kirtland Temple, the first temple of the broader Latter Day Saint movement, which includes other smaller churches such as the Community of Christ. The term "endowment" thus has various meanings historically, and within the other branches of the Latter Day Saint movement.

The prevalence of LDS Church members who participate in the endowment ceremony is difficult to determine. However, estimates show that fewer than half of converts to the LDS Church ultimately undergo the first endowment ceremony, and young people preparing for missions account for about one-third of "live" endowments (as contrasted with proxy endowments for the deceased). The second endowment ceremony had been given 15,000 times by 1941, but has become less common today.

Previous Latter Day Saint endowments

The meaning and scope of the term endowment evolved during the early Latter Day Saint movement, of which Mormonism is a part. The term derives from the Authorized King James Version, referring to the spiritual gifts given the disciples of Jesus on the day of Pentecost, in which they were "endowed with power from on high," Christians generally understand this endowment to refer to the gift of the Holy Spirit, which the Latter Day Saints believe is given at the Confirmation ceremony. In 1831, however, Smith began teaching that the elders of the church needed to be further "endowed with power from on high" in order to be effective proselytizers. He therefore gathered the elders together at a general conference in June 1831 and "endowed" them with this power by ordaining them to the High Priesthood.

By the mid-1830s, Smith was teaching that a further endowment was necessary, this time requiring the completion of the Kirtland Temple as a house of God where God could pour out his Holy Spirit. Upon the completion of the Kirtland Temple after three years of construction (1833–1836), the elders of the church gathered for this second promised endowment in early 1836. The Kirtland endowment included a ritual ceremony involving preparatory washings and anointings with oil, followed by a gathering in the temple in which many reported spiritual gifts such as speaking in tongues and visions.

The Nauvoo endowment

Overview
The Nauvoo endowment consists of two phases: (1) an initiation, and (2) an instructional and testing phase. The initiation consists of a washing and anointing, culminating in the clothing of the patron in a "Garment of the Holy Priesthood", which is thereafter worn as an undergarment.

The instructional and testing phase of the endowment consists of a scripted reenactment of Adam and Eve's experience in the Garden of Eden (performed by live actors—called officiators; in the mid-20th century certain portions were adapted to a film presentation). The instruction is punctuated with oaths, symbolic gestures, and a prayer around an altar, and at the end of instruction, the initiate's knowledge of symbolic gestures and key-words is tested at a "veil."

Introduction
On May 3, 1842, Joseph Smith prepared the second floor of his Red Brick Store, in Nauvoo, Illinois, to represent "the interior of a temple as circumstances would permit". The next day, May 4, he introduced the Nauvoo endowment ceremony to nine associates: Associate President and Patriarch to the Church Hyrum (Joseph Smith's brother); first counselor in the First Presidency, William Law; three of the twelve apostles, Brigham Young, Heber C. Kimball and Willard Richards; Nauvoo stake president, William Marks; two bishops, Newel K. Whitney and George Miller; and a close friend, Judge James Adams of Springfield, Illinois.

Concerning the day's activities, Smith recorded:

Throughout 1843 and 1844 Smith continued to initiate other men, as well as women, into the endowment ceremony. By the time of his death on June 27, 1844, more than 50 persons had been admitted into the Anointed Quorum, the name by which this group called themselves.

The Nauvoo endowment and Freemasonry

There are many similarities between Smith's endowment ceremony and certain rituals of Freemasonry, particularly the Royal Arch degree. These specific similarities included instruction in various signs, tokens, and passwords, and the imposition of various forms of the penalties for revealing them. The original wording of the penalties, for example, closely followed the graphic wording of the Masonic penalties.

According to the predominant view by historians, Smith used and adapted material from the Masonic rituals in creating the endowment ceremony. All of those first initiated by Smith on May 4, 1842, were longstanding or recent Masons: Adams was the Deputy Grand Master of the Masonic Grand Lodge of Illinois; Whitney, Miller and Kimball had previously been Lodge Masters; Smith's brother, Hyrum, had been a Mason since 1827; and the remaining five participants (Law, Marks, Young, Richards, and Smith himself) had been initiated as Freemasons just weeks before the meeting. However, none of these Masons ever charged Smith with breaking any of Masonry's oaths or revealing its secrets. In contrast to those that believe Smith simply copied these rituals to advance his own religion, one Mormon historian has noted that these Masonic parallels confirmed to these men "the breath of the restoration impulse and was evidence of Smith's divine calling".

The LDS Church has never commented officially on these similarities, although certain features of the two rituals have been called "analogous" by one official Church Historian and the apostle Jeffrey R. Holland stated in a BBC interview that endowment ordinance vows to secrecy are "similar to a Masonic relationship." The LDS Church apostle John A. Widtsoe downplayed the similarities, arguing that they "do not deal with the basic matters [the endowment] but rather with the mechanism of the ritual." One LDS Church educator, however, was censured in the 1970s by the Church Educational System for arguing that the endowment ceremony had a dependent relationship with the rituals of freemasonry.

Some within the LDS Church, particularly Smith's contemporaries, have expressed the view that the endowment was given anciently by God in its original form at the Temple of Solomon, but that the form of the ritual degenerated into the form used by Freemasons. Heber C. Kimball clearly supported this position: "We have the true Masonry. The Masonry of today is received from the apostasy which took place in the days of Solomon and David. They have now and then a thing that is correct, but we have the real thing."

Later modifications by the LDS Church
After Smith officiated in Brigham Young's endowment in 1842 Smith told him, "Brother Brigham, this is not arranged perfectly; however we have done the best we could under the circumstances in which we are placed. I wish you to take this matter in hand: organize and systematize all these ceremonies". Young did as Smith directed, and under Young's direction the Nauvoo endowment ceremony was introduced to the church at large in the Nauvoo Temple during the winter of 1845–46. A spacious hall in the temple's attic was arranged into appropriate ordinance "rooms" using canvas partitions. Potted plants were used in areas representing the Garden of Eden, and other areas were furnished appropriately, including a room representing the celestial kingdom. Over 5,500 persons received their endowments in this temple.

Young introduced the same ceremony in the Utah Territory in the 1850s, first in the Endowment House and then in the St. George Temple. During this period the ceremony had never been written down, but was passed orally from temple worker to worker. Shortly after the dedication of the St. George Temple, and before his death in 1877, Young became concerned about the possibility of variations in the ceremony within the church's temples and so directed the majority of the text of the endowment to be written down. This document became the standard for the ceremony thereafter. Also in 1877, the first endowments for the dead were performed in the St. George Temple.

In 1893, minor alterations in the text were made in an attempt to bring uniformity to the ceremony as administered in the temples. Between 1904 and 1906, the temple ceremony received very public scrutiny during the 1904 Senate investigation of LDS Apostle and U.S. Senator, Reed Smoot. Of particular concern to senators was the ceremony's "law of vengeance", in which, during the hearings, it was revealed that participants took an oath of vengeance to pray that God would "avenge the blood of the prophets on this nation". The "prophets" were Joseph and Hyrum Smith, and "this nation" was the United States.

Beginning in 1919, church president Heber J. Grant appointed a committee charged with revising the ceremony, which was done under the direction of Apostle George F. Richards from 1921 to 1927. Richards received permission to write down the previously unwritten portions of the ceremony. Among his revisions was the elimination of the "law of vengeance". Previous versions of the ceremony into the 1880s also had the representative of the Lord cut the symbols in the garments with a knife through the veil, with one source suggesting an early version cut into the knee of the participant to create a scar. The committee also removed the violent language from the "penalty" portions of the ceremony. Prior to 1927, participants made an oath that if they ever revealed the secret gestures of the ceremony, they would be subject to the following:
 Each temple president received a "President's Book" with the revised ceremony ensuring uniformity throughout the church's temples.

The first filmed versions of the endowment were introduced in the 1950s, by a committee headed by Gordon B. Hinckley. That change was initiated by church president David O. McKay as a way of providing the instruction simultaneously in different languages, an innovation made necessary by the construction of the Bern Switzerland Temple, the church's first temple in Europe. , ceremonies in all but two (Salt Lake Temple and Manti Temple) of the church's 128 operating temples are presented using the filmed version.

In 1990, further changes included the elimination of all blood oaths and penalties. These penalties, representing what the member would rather suffer than reveal the sacred signs given them in the ceremony, were symbolized by gestures for having the throat cut, the breast cut open, and the bowels torn out. Changes also included the elimination of the five points of fellowship, the role of the preacher, and all reference to Lucifer's "popes and priests" were dropped.

The ceremony was also changed to lessen the differences in treatment between men and women. Women no longer are required to covenant to obey their husbands, but instead must covenant only to follow their husbands as their husbands follow God. Also, Eve is no longer explicitly blamed for the Fall, and several references to Adam were replaced with references to Adam and Eve. (See below about 2019). The lecture at the veil was also cut, and some repetition was eliminated.

In the temple endowment, women were previously urged to be a priestess "unto her husband," while men were promised they will be priests to God. In January 2019, that topic was removed from the endowment process, in accordance with other changes that included more lines for Eve in their ritual performance of the Book of Genesis. Also in 2019, a letter from the church's First Presidency stated that "Veiling an endowed woman's face prior to burial is optional." It had previously been required. The letter went on to say that such veiling, "may be done if the sister expressed such a desire while she was living. In cases where the wishes of the deceased sister on this matter are not known, her family should be consulted."

A 1996 estimate by Richard Cowan states that around 150 million endowments have been performed, most of which were in behalf of deceased persons.

Modern endowment as practiced by the LDS Church
The most well-known Mormon endowment ceremony is that performed by the LDS Church in its temples. This ceremony is open only to members of the church deemed worthy and given a "temple recommend" by their ecclesiastical leaders after one or more personal interviews. It comprises four parts:
 An initiatory composed of the preparatory ordinances of washing and anointing
 An instructional portion with lectures and representations
 The making of covenants (i.e. oaths)
 A testing of knowledge

The initiatory

The "initiatory" is a prelude to the endowment proper, similar to Chrismation, and consists of (1) instruction, (2) multiple symbolic washing and anointing ordinances, (3) being clothed in the temple garment, and (4) receiving a "new name" in preparation for the endowment.

Washing and anointing are perhaps the earliest practiced temple ordinances for the living since the organization of the LDS Church. There is evidence that these ordinances have been performed since 1832. They were first practiced in the Whitney Store as part of the School of the Prophets and were part of the Kirtland endowment.

As part of the endowment ceremony, the ordinance of washing and anointing symbolizes the ritual cleansing of priests that took place at Israel's Tabernacle, Solomon's Temple, and the Second Temple, later known as Herod's Temple. The washing symbolizes being "cleansed from the blood of this generation," and being anointed to become "clean from the blood and sins of this generation."

After the washing and anointing, the patron is given the temple garment, formally called the "Garment of the Holy Priesthood". This garment represents the "coats of skins" given to Adam and Eve in the Garden of Eden.

Similar ordinances are performed for the living and the dead in LDS temples, where men are:
 Ordained to the priesthood (for the dead only, since a man coming to the temple for his own endowment would have previously received his Melchizedek priesthood ordination)
 Washed with water (which only involves a cursory sprinkling of water)
 Blessed to have the washing sealed
 Anointed with oil
 Blessed to have the anointing sealed
 Clothed in holy garments
Women receive the same ordinances, except for the ordination.

As the final part of the initiatory, the patron is given a new name, which is a key word used during the ceremony. In general, this name is only known to the person to whom it is given; however, an endowed LDS woman reveals her name to her endowed husband (but not vice versa). In support of this practice, the LDS church cites Book of Revelation 2:17 and 3:12, referring to a "white stone" with "a new name written" thereon.

The instructional portion

The endowment focuses heavily on LDS belief in a plan of salvation and centered around the atonement of Jesus Christ on behalf of humanity's sins. Parts of the doctrine of the plan of salvation explained include:

The eternal Nature of God, of Jesus Christ, and their divinity
The pre-mortal existence and eternal nature of man (mankind lived with God before mortal life)
The reality of Satan, who is Jesus' and Adam's rebellious spirit brother
The fall of Adam and the reasons for mortality, trials, and blessings
The Atonement of Jesus Christ, and the need for the Atonement
The relationship of grace, faith, and works
Death, the literal resurrection, and qualifying for one of the three kingdoms of glory (or Outer Darkness)
The need for personal righteousness, covenant keeping, and love of God and fellow man
That Heavenly Father loves humanity as his children and wants people to become like he is, to receive joy
The sanctity and eternal nature of the family

The endowment is often thought of as a series of lectures where Latter-day Saints are taught about the creation of the world, the events in the Garden of Eden, what happened after Adam and Eve were cast out of the Garden into the "telestial world", and the progression of righteous individuals through "terrestrial" laws to one of the kingdoms of glory and exaltation.

During the ceremony, Latter-day Saints are dressed in temple clothes or temple robes, are taught in ordinance rooms about various gospel laws (including obedience, chastity, sacrifice and consecration) and make covenants to obey these laws. The early Mormon leader Brigham Young taught that participants are given "signs and tokens" that "enable you to walk back to the presence of the Father, passing the angels who stand as sentinels" and gain eternal exaltation. At the end of the ceremony, the participant is "tested" on their knowledge of what he or she was taught and covenanted to do and then admitted into the celestial room, where he or she may meditate and pray.

Covenant portion

The LDS Church defines a covenant as:

The temple ceremony involves entering into solemn covenants. These covenants are to live, obey, and keep the laws of obedience, sacrifice, the gospel of Jesus Christ, chastity, and consecration. The promise given in the ceremony is that those who remain faithful will be endowed "with power from on high."

Testing portion

At the end of the endowment ceremony the participant is tested at a physical veil by a man representing the Lord on the signs and tokens just learned. Before 1990 at the veil the participant also put their arm around and pressed their cheek, shoulders, knees and feet against the person through the veil in what was called "the five points of fellowship."

Requirements for participation
See also Temple (LDS Church) Entrance Requirements
The endowment is open only to Mormons who have a valid "temple recommend." To be eligible to receive a temple recommend, one must be deemed worthy by church leadership and have been a member of the LDS Church for at least one year. A male member of the church must hold the Melchizedek priesthood to participate in the endowment. A temple recommend is signed by the person receiving the recommend, a member of the person's bishopric and a member of the stake presidency, who each perform a personal, one-on-one "worthiness interview." Persons seeking a recommend to attend the temple for the first time and receive their endowment will generally meet with their bishop and stake president.

These interviews cover what the church believes to be the most important factors of personal morality and worthiness, including whether the person has a basic belief in key church doctrines such as the divinity of Jesus and the restoration; whether the person attends church meetings and supports the leadership of the LDS Church; whether the person affiliates with Mormon fundamentalists or other people considered by the church to be apostate; whether the person is honest and lives the law of chastity and the Word of Wisdom; whether the person abuses family members; whether the person pays tithing and any applicable spousal or child support; and whether the person has confessed to serious past sins.

Prior to participating in the endowment, members of the LDS Church frequently participate in a six-part temple preparation class which discusses temple-related topics but does not directly discuss the details of the ceremony.

Secrecy

Official church publications state that temple ceremonies are confidential and not to be discussed outside the temple. B. H. Roberts declared that certain aspects of the endowment ceremony were intended to be "secret from the world". In this regard, facsimile no. 2 in the Book of Abraham (part of the LDS Church standard works) clarifies that there are things that "cannot be revealed unto the world; but is to be had in the Holy Temple of God." This information includes, in the initiation and instructional/testing phases of the endowment ceremony, certain names and symbolic gestures called tokens and signs. Prior to revisions in 1990, the LDS Church's version of the endowment also included a gesture called a "penalty." The ceremony stated that the "representation of the execution of the penalties indicates different ways in which life may be taken". However, the LDS Church has removed the "penalty" portions of the ceremony, protecting the "names", "tokens," and "signs" by a simple "covenant and promise." Still, such information has been published in various sources, unauthorized by the LDS Church.

Other than the ceremony's signs and tokens (and formerly penalties), which remain a central part of the ceremonies, the remainder of the ceremony carries with it no covenants of secrecy. However, most Latter-day Saints are generally unwilling to discuss the specific details of the ceremony. Latter-day Saints commonly state that the rituals are "sacred" but not "secret," and Latter-day Saint apostle Boyd K. Packer has encouraged members not to "discuss the temple ordinances outside the temples" as well as top leaders in 2019.

In practice, Mormons keep silent about the ceremony for numerous reasons. Most Mormons hold the making of these covenants to be highly sacred. Most LDS Church members also believe that details of the ceremony should be kept from those who are not properly prepared. Many Mormons believe that Jesus often taught in parables for the same reason. Other Latter-day Saints remain silent about the ceremony because they believe that its meaning cannot be properly conveyed without the experience in the temple. Brigham Young stated:

In addition, church members are instructed by top church leaders that the only place where the temple ceremonies should be discussed, even amongst faithful members, is within the temple.

Some Mormons have suggested that the reluctance to discuss the endowment encourages attacks and unauthorized exposés by evangelical Christians and others, and therefore advocate a more transparent attitude toward the ceremony. Transparency has increased a little bit since such criticisms were levied. In the online versions of the General Handbook the specific covenants made during the endowment have been enumerated. This is the only new item that was not publicly discussed about the endowment that was added.

Biblical references
Latter Day Saints cite multiple Old Testament passages detailing ancient Israelite temple practices that parallel the modern endowment ceremony. The initiatory ordinances are the most well-attested to in the Bible, with parallel ceremonies being described in several passages, such as those found in Exodus 29:4–9 and Exodus 28:2–43 and Leviticus 8:6–13. Exodus 40:12–15 is also a commonly cited reference to the initiatory ordinances: 12. And thou shalt bring Aaron and his sons unto the door of the tabernacle of the congregation, and wash them with water.

13. And thou shalt put upon Aaron the holy garments, and anoint him, and sanctify him; that he may minister unto me in the priest's office.

14. And thou shalt bring his sons, and clothe them with coats:

15. And thou shalt anoint them, as thou didst anoint their father, that they may minister unto me in the priest's office: for their anointing shall surely be an everlasting priesthood throughout their generations. 
In the New Testament, passages such as 1 John 2:20 speak of an anointing from the "Holy One" which leads the anointed to "know all things," and 1 John 2:27 reiterates this, stating that the anointed were taught by this anointing "all things." Revelation 1:6 describes the Saints as having been made priests and kings unto God, which is an essential theme in the Latter Day Saint temple endowment. Revelation 2:17 is often cited in relation to the endowment because of its references to "hidden manna" and the receipt of a "new name." In addition, Latter Day Saints interpret Luke 24:49 as instructing the apostles to wait for both the pouring out of the Spirit on the day of Pentecost and the endowment ceremony before going out to evangelize. The words "HOLINESS TO THE LORD" can be found on Latter-day Saint temples as referenced in Exodus 28:36.

Latter Day Saint scholarship 
The Latter Day Saint viewpoint is that the endowment is of ancient origin, revealed from the earliest time to the biblical Adam. Much research has been done by Latter Day Saints finding parallels between the endowment and ancient traditions. The LDS Church temple is referred to as a "house of learning" since it is a "kind of educational environment teaching by action and educating through ritual." The endowment ordinance, as presented in Latter-day Saint temples, has been referred to as a "ritual drama" that commemorates episodes of sacred history due to its “theatrical setting.” When viewed as a restoration of ancient rites, the ritual drama and aesthetic environment in which the endowment is presented are both rich in Judeo-Christian symbolism. Comparative studies of the art, architecture, and rituals found in Mormonism, such as the endowment, reveal parallels to early Catholic and Jewish traditions.

Washing, anointing, and investiture in holy garments are described throughout the Hebrew Bible in the form of priestly and royal initiations. Exodus 28, Exodus 29, Exodus 40, and Leviticus 8 all detail this ancient practice. Many medieval and ancient apocryphal, pseudepigraphical, and other religious writings also provide further information about and references to ancient initiation ceremonies.

The apocryphal book of 2 Enoch reads, "And the Lord said to Michael, 'Go, and extract Enoch from [his] earthly clothing. And anoint him with my delightful oil, and put him into the clothes of my glory.' And so Michael did, just as the Lord had said to him. He anointed me and he clothed me. And the appearance of that oil is greater than the greatest light, and its ointment is like sweet dew, and its fragrance like myrrh; and it is like rays of the glittering sun. And I looked at myself, and I have become like one of his glorious ones." The text is also important for its description of the ascension of Enoch through multiple heavens.

In addition, the Testament of Levi 8:2-10 reads, "And I saw seven men in white clothing, who were saying to me, 'Arise, put on the vestments of the priesthood, the crown of righteousness, the oracle of understanding, the robe of truth, the breastplate of faith, the miter for the head, and the apron for prophetic power.' Each carried one of these and put them on me and said, 'From now on be a priest, you and all your posterity.' The first anointed me with holy oil and gave me a staff. The second washed me with pure water, fed me by hand with bread and holy wine, and put on me a holy and glorious vestment. The third put on me something made of linen, like an ephod. The fourth placed . . . around me a girdle which was like purple. The fifth gave me a branch of rich olive wood. The sixth placed a wreath on my head. The seventh placed the priestly diadem on me and filled my hands with incense, in order that I might serve as priest for the Lord God."

Some scholars have suggested that Jewish temple initiation was later merged with early Christian baptismal initiation sometime after the destruction of the Second Temple. By the fourth century C.E., Christian baptism had adopted a much more dramatic and complex set of rituals accompanying it, including washing ceremonies, physical anointing with oil, being signed with a cross on the forehead, and receiving white garments and a new name, all which paralleled the Jewish initiation for priests and kings. St. Cyril of Jerusalem, in his Catechetical Lectures, related the anointing with oil at baptism with the anointing of a priest and king in the Old Testament, suggesting that the initiate actually became a priest and king in Christ.

The general theme of ascension through multiple gates or veils of heaven is found all throughout early Jewish, Christian, Muslim, and other Near Eastern religious writings, as well as in the Bible. Early works often describe angels and other sentinels which are set at these points, and several of these state that the ascending individual would be required to give specific signs and names to the sentinels in order to pass through the veil. The descriptions of key words, signs, and tokens being presented to the sentinels of the veils of heaven are particularly prevalent in old Gnostic Christian and Mandaean writings, and in Jewish lore. In one of the Nag Hammadi texts, Jesus promises that those who accept him would pass by each of the gates of heaven without fear and would be perfected in the third heaven. The Coptic Book of 1 Jeu describes Jesus instructing the apostles in the hand-signs, names, and seals that they must use before the guardians of heaven would remove the veils of heaven to allow them passage. In Hekhalot Rabbati 17:1-20:3, an old Jewish esoteric text, the faithful pass through seven doors in order to enter the presence of God, passing by angels whose names they must give, while presenting a seal. 3 Enoch also describes the names and seals given to the angels.

Similar concepts were found anciently all over the Near East. The ancient Egyptian Book of the Dead detailed various spells and names meant to assist the deceased in their ascension through the gates of the afterlife so they could eventually enter into the presence of the gods. Fragments of the Book of the Dead are, in fact, known to have been part of Joseph Smith's collection of Egyptian papyri, but, at the time, the Egyptian language was untranslatable by any scholarly means.

The Latter Day Saint temple garment is usually identified by Mormon scholars with the sacred "linen breeches" (michnasayim/mikhnesei bahd) and the "coat of linen" (kuttoneth) that ancient Israelite priests were commanded to wear, as referenced in Exodus 28:39-43. The michnasayim were undergarments that reached from the hips to the thighs and served the purpose of hiding the wearer's "nakedness" and maintaining modesty. These garments symbolized the abolition of the distinction between the heavenly and mortal part of man, and, like the LDS temple garment, were worn by the Israelite priest even when he wasn't actually officiating in the temple. The kuttoneth was probably a white, tight-fitting, shirt-like undergarment worn in conjunction with the michnasayim. According to the Talmud, worn-out undergarments and priestly sashes were burned, being used as torch wicks in the temple.

Additionally, the temple garment has been compared to the modern tallit katan, a sacred undershirt of Orthodox and ultra-Orthodox Judaism. Both the Latter Day Saint temple garment and the tallit katan are meant to be worn all day under regular clothing as a constant reminder of the covenants, promises, and obligations the wearer is under.

See also

 Second anointing

Notes

References

 .
 .
 .
 .
 .
 .
 .
 .
 .
 .
 .
 Ehat, Andrew (1982). "Joseph Smith's Introduction of Temple Ordinances and the 1844 Mormon Succession Crisis", Thesis, Brigham Young University, Provo, Utah.
 .
 LDS Church (2002). Preparing to Enter the Holy Temple. LDS Church, Salt Lake City, Utah. † Note: This pamphlet is adapted from Packer's The Holy Temple.
 .†
 .†
 .
 .
 .
 Packer, Boyd K. (1980). The Holy Temple. Bookcraft Publishers, Salt Lake City, Utah. .
 . See also: Book of Commandments
 Prince, Gregory A. (1995). Power From On High: The Development of Mormon Priesthood, Signature Books, Salt Lake City. . excerpt
.
 Smith, Joseph, et al. (February 1, 1832 - November 1, 1834) Kirtland Revelation Book, LDS Church Archives, Salt Lake City, Utah. Digital reprint by the Joseph Smith Papers Project
 .
 .
 .
 Widstoe, John (1954). Discourses of Brigham Young, Deseret Book, Salt Lake City, Utah.
 Widstoe, John (1960). Evidences and Reconciliations, Bookcraft, Salt Lake City, Utah.

† The materials published by the LDS Church directly may only be available from the church's distribution center.

Further reading

  An article by FARMS that critiques in detail the accuracy and reliability of David John Buerger's The Mysteries of Godliness: A History of Mormon Temple Worship.

External links
 The LDS Endowment, at ldsendowment.org – a detailed source of information about the endowment.
 . Comprehensive list of articles and books on LDS temples; site also includes an LDS Temple Preparation FAQ.

1842 introductions
1842 in Christianity
All articles with unsourced statements
Mormonism and Freemasonry
Creation myths
Latter Day Saint temple practices
Latter Day Saint terms
Adam and Eve in Mormonism
Religious concepts related with Adam and Eve